Audrey Smedley (1930 – October 14, 2020) was an American social anthropologist and professor emeritus at Virginia Commonwealth University in anthropology and African-American studies.

Early life and education
Smedley received her BA and MA in history and anthropology from the University of Michigan, and a PhD in social anthropology from the University of Manchester in the UK, based on field research in northern Nigeria. She taught undergraduate and graduate-level courses in social anthropology, African societies and cultures, the history of anthropology, and anthropological theory.

Career
Smedley wrote on the history of anthropology and the origin and evolution of the idea of human races since the late 1970s. Her research interests also included comparative slavery, human ecological adaptation, and the roles of women in patrilineal societies.

References

External links
 Faculty page
 PBS interview for the program "Race: the Power of an Illusion".
 
 

1930 births
2020 deaths
African-American academics
American anthropologists
University of Michigan College of Literature, Science, and the Arts alumni
Virginia Commonwealth University faculty
20th-century African-American people
21st-century African-American people